The Central District of Meshgin Shahr County is in Ardabil province, Iran. At the 2006 census, its population was 112,128 in 26,284 households. The following census in 2011 counted 114,726 people in 30,979 households. At the latest census in 2016, the district had 107,557 inhabitants living in 32,434 households.

References 

Meshgin Shahr County

Districts of Ardabil Province

Populated places in Ardabil Province

Populated places in Meshgin Shahr County